Vladan Čukić (Serbian Cyrillic: Владан Чукић; born 27 June 1980) is a Serbian footballer.

Honours

Kecskemét
Hungarian Cup: 2010–11

Ferencváros
Nemzeti Bajnokság I: 2015–16
Hungarian Cup: 2014–15, 2015–16, 2016–17
Hungarian League Cup: 2012–13, 2014–15
Hungarian Super Cup: 2015, 2016

External links
 HLSZ profile

1980 births
Living people
Sportspeople from Smederevo
Serbian footballers
Serbian expatriate footballers
Association football midfielders
FK Smederevo players
Serbian SuperLiga players
Kecskeméti TE players
Mezőkövesdi SE footballers
Ferencvárosi TC footballers
Nemzeti Bajnokság I players
Expatriate footballers in Hungary
Serbian expatriate sportspeople in Hungary